Justice Duel is a platform game developed and published by Mega Cat Studios. It was released on the Nintendo Entertainment System in 2017. Players battle one another while riding cybernetically enhanced eagles. The game plays similarly to Joust.

Gameplay 
The player controls a cyborg version of a past President of the United States riding a cybernetically enhanced eagle to duel either against other human players or the game's AI. The player duels by firing projectiles at their opponents; a level is completed once there are no remaining opponents. Players can pick up power-ups in the form of mines and traps to use against opponents.
Justice Duel supports multiplayer for up to four players through the NES Four Score.

Development 
Besides Joust, the game's developers cite TowerFall and Balloon Fight as having inspired elements of the game's design.

Evercade Release 

Mega Cat Studios released Justice Duel in a compilation cartridge for the Evercade, along with several other titles from the studio, including Little Medusa, Log Jammers, and Coffee Crisis.

Child's Play Edition

In 2018, Mega Cat Studios released a special edition of Justice Duel to raise money for the charity Child's Play; it debuted at PAX East and was part of the Omegathon tournament. This special edition of the game features two additional playable characters: Della and Rod, who ride a duck and a quail, respectively.

Reception 
Justice Duel has received a generally positive reception from the press, being praised for its aesthetic and fast paced gameplay.

References

External links 
 

Birds in popular culture
Cyborgs in fiction
Fictional presidents of the United States
Nintendo Entertainment System games
Nintendo Entertainment System-only games
Indie video games
Platform games
Unauthorized video games
Video games developed in the United States
2017 video games